The Mt. Van Hoevenberg Olympic Bobsled Run is a venue for bobsleigh, luge and skeleton in the United States, located at the Lake Placid Olympic Sports Complex in Lake Placid, New York. This venue was used for the 1932 and 1980 Winter Olympics and for the only winter Goodwill Games in 2000.  The third and most recent version of the track was completed in 2000 with the track hosting both the first FIBT World Championships and FIL World Luge Championships done outside of Europe, doing so in 1949 and 1983.  In 2010 the bobsled track was listed on the National Register of Historic Places.

History 

The bobsled track was built in 1930. The following year, Popular Science reported that it was "... called the only scientifically constructed bobsled run in America and the only one of its kind in the world." According to the National Park Service:
Carved out of wilderness and surrounded by forested land on all sides, the one and one-half mile long Olympic Bobsled Run was constructed in 1930 and built specifically for the 1932 Winter Olympic Games. The course was designed by Stanislaus Sentzytsky, a renowned German course designer, who designed a course that was radically different from its European counterparts. The Lake Placid course was longer, steeper, and featured a more pronounced drop in curves than European runs, which allowed for steadier driving and faster speeds than those obtained on prior bobsled events. After the American team won two gold medals and one silver in 1932, bobsledding, previously unknown in America, captivated the country’s interest, and U.S. teams dominated the sport until 1956. Although portions of the course have been retired, parts of the original Olympic Bobsled Run continue to be used for training and recreation.

As Mt. Van Hoevenberg Olympic Bobsled Run, the structure was listed on the U.S. National Register of Historic Places on February 4, 2010. The listing was announced as the featured listing in the National Park Service's weekly list of February 19, 2010.

Prior to the 1932 Winter Olympics, bobsleigh racing took place at the steep hill where the Intervales ski jump would eventually be located. The attendees were delighted by the speeds of the bobsleds though several teams crashed during the run, sending two members of one team to the hospital as a result. The Intervales track only lasted one season (1929–30). Led by Henry Homburger, the first track was surveyed and constructed during 1929-30 at Mount Van Hoevenberg, located in the Whiteface Mountain area though it was in spite of protests of using state-owned lands for construction of the facility for environmental reasons. After construction took place during August–December 1930, the track opened for use on Christmas Day 1930.

In 1949, the track became the first venue outside of Europe to host the FIBT World Championships though it would start with tragic results when Belgian Max Houben was killed during a practice run off of "Shady" curve prior to the event; the Belgian team withdrew as a result.

It would be another twelve years before the track hosted another world championship following safety improvements to the track. By this time, track officials had established a relationship with the International Bobsleigh and Tobogganing Federation (FIBT). Sergio Zardini's fatal crash at the "Zig-Zag curves" on 22 February 1966 led to further safety improvements.

Following the world bobsleigh championships of 1969, 1973, and 1978, many race officials of those championships would serve on the organizing committee for the bobsleigh part of the 1980 Winter Olympics. In 1978 actual construction took place during September 1978-February 1979 with the creation of a reinforced concrete, artificially refrigerated bobsleigh track. The bobsleigh track was approved for competition in December 1979. In fall 1977, a separate luge track for the 1980 Games, the first one in the United States, was constructed with completion in time for the test competition in February 1979. During preparations for the 1980 Games, a combined two-man bobsleigh and luge track was considered, but abandoned to high cost and the track was redesigned with permission from the International Luge Federation (FIL). Following the 1980 games, both tracks hosted their respective world championships in 1983. The 1932 track continued to be used strictly for passenger riding after the new combined track was sanctioned.

Skeleton racing debuted during the 1990s with the bobsleigh part of the track hosting the world championships in 1997. By the late 1990s, parts of both tracks were demolished to make way for a new track that was constructed for the 2000 Winter Goodwill Games that was completed in January 2000. The track has been part of the Lake Placid Olympic Sports Complex since the end of the 1980 Winter Olympics as part of the Olympic Regional Development Authority (ORDA).

Since 2006, it has hosted the Chevy Geoff Bodine Bobsled Challenge, an annual event which has NASCAR drivers take a run down the track to benefit the Bo-Dyn Bobsled Project (co-created by the former NASCAR driver and 1986 Daytona 500 winner) in use by the United States since the start of the 1994 Winter Olympics. In 2009, the competition took place between NASCAR and the National Hot Rod Association (NHRA) which was won by Jeg Coughlin Jr. (NHRA) won the event. The 2010 event took place at the track 8–10 January with Melanie Troxel on the NHRA becoming the first woman to compete in the event.

In 2009, the track became the first to host bobsleigh, luge, and skeleton world championships in the same year in a non-Winter Olympic year (The bobsleigh, luge, and skeleton track in Park City, Utah was the first to do so for the 2002 Winter Olympics in neighboring Salt Lake City).

Current track statistics

The track names were given by John Morgan during Speed Channel's World Cup bobsleigh coverage on 30 December 2006. Turn one is not listed. Even though luge - men's singles has their starthouse to the right of bobsleigh and skeleton start, the men's singles start in the same location as the bobsleigh and skeleton.

Previous tracks
The only curves mentioned in the 1932 Winter Olympics official report of the 26 total are shown below:

The luge track used for the 1980 Winter Olympics had two different settings to the different start houses used during the competition.

Championships hosted 
 Winter Olympics: 1932, 1980
 FIBT World Championships: 1949, 1961, 1969, 1973, 1978, 1983, 1997 (men's skeleton), 2003 (Men's bobsleigh), 2009, 2012
 FIL World Luge Championships: 1983, 2009

References

External links

 Official website

Venues of the 1932 Winter Olympics
Venues of the 1980 Winter Olympics
Bobsleigh, luge, and skeleton tracks
Olympic bobsleigh venues
Olympic luge venues
Sports venues in New York (state)
Sports venues on the National Register of Historic Places in New York (state)
Sports venues in Essex County, New York
National Register of Historic Places in Essex County, New York
1930 establishments in New York (state)
Sports venues completed in 1930